English Harbour West is a village located on the south west shore of Fortune Bay. It is noted for its bank fishing and inshore fishing. The Way Office was established in 1866 on April 1. The first Way Master was Albert Stirling. In 1891 it became a Post Office town and William Evans was the first Postmaster.

English Harbour West is now a part of the Town of St. Jacques-Coomb's Cove.

Fitzgerald Academy, a kindergarten to 12th grade school, is located in English Harbour West.

References

Populated coastal places in Canada
Populated places in Newfoundland and Labrador